Turbonilla aola is a species of sea snail, a marine gastropod mollusk in the family Pyramidellidae, the pyrams and their allies.

References

aola
Gastropods described in 2010